TUC may refer to:

Places
 Teniente General Benjamín Matienzo International Airport, Tucumán, Argentina (IATA code: TUC)
 San Rafael Airport (Venezuela) (NDB code: TUC)
 Tung Chung station, Hong Kong; MTR (station code TUC)
 Tucana (constellation), standard astronomical abbreviation

Organizations
 Hong Kong and Kowloon Trades Union Council
 Turismo Aéreo de Chile (ICAO airline code: TUC) airline of Chile, see List of airline codes
 Transvaal University College
 Technical University of Crete
 Trades Union Congress, a federation of trade unions in England and Wales
 Trades Union Congress of Ghana
 Trade Union Congress of Nigeria (2005)
 Aden Trade Union Congress
 Third Unitarian Church, a Unitarian Universalist church in the West Side of Chicago, Illinois

Other uses
 Mutu language (ISO 639 code: tuc)
 Time of useful consciousness, duration of useful functioning in an hypoxic environment
 Star Trek VI: The Undiscovered Country, 1991 American science fiction film directed by Nicholas Meyer
 TUC (cracker), brand of salted octagonal golden-yellow crackers

See also
 Tucson International Airport (code TUS, not TUC)